Helen Morlok (born May 19, 1930 in Lansing, Michigan, died October 31, 2003 in Lansing, Michigan) is one of the four sisters listed in the Guinness Book of World Records as the world's oldest identical quadruplets. Her sisters were Edna, Wilma, and Sarah. The sisters performed tap dance and comedy routines throughout the mid-east U.S. in the 1930s and 1940s. Her sister Wilma died in 2002. Helen died on October 31, 2003 at the age of 73. Edna died on April 10, 2015 at the age of 84. As of 2016, Sarah Morlok Cotton was still alive. Cotton published a book on the girls' childhood called The Morlok Quadruplets: The Alphabet Sisters.

References

1930 births
2003 deaths
Quadruplets
People from Lansing, Michigan
American tap dancers